Tecomanthe is a genus of 5 species of tropical or subtropical forest lianes in the family Bignoniaceae. They have attractive trumpet-like flowers and glossy leaves. They are native to Australia, Indonesia, New Guinea, New Zealand, and the Solomon Islands.

Species

References

 St Andrews Botanic Garden, Plant of the month: Tecomanthe dendrophylla. Accessed 26 July 2013.

Bignoniaceae
Bignoniaceae genera
Taxa named by Henri Ernest Baillon